Daniel Porter Jordan III (born November 20, 1964) is the Chief United States district judge of the United States District Court for the Southern District of Mississippi.

Education and career

Born in Fort Bragg, North Carolina, Jordan received a Bachelor of Business Administration degree from the University of Mississippi in 1987 and a Juris Doctor from the University of Virginia Law School in 1993. He was in private practice in Jackson, Mississippi, from 1993 to 2006.

Federal judicial service

On April 24, 2006, Jordan was nominated by President George W. Bush to a seat on the United States District Court for the Southern District of Mississippi vacated by Tom Stewart Lee. Jordan was confirmed by the United States Senate on July 20, 2006, and received his commission on August 7, 2006. He became Chief Judge on November 4, 2017.

Sources

1964 births
Living people
Judges of the United States District Court for the Southern District of Mississippi
Mississippi lawyers
People from Fort Bragg, North Carolina
United States district court judges appointed by George W. Bush
21st-century American judges
University of Mississippi alumni
University of Virginia School of Law alumni